This is a list of places on the Victorian Heritage Register in the Shire of Colac Otway in Victoria, Australia. The Victorian Heritage Register is maintained by the Heritage Council of Victoria.

The Victorian Heritage Register, as of 2020, lists the following 11 state-registered places within the Shire of Colac Otway:

References

Colac Otway
Shire of Colac Otway